Dolichovespula pacifica xanthicincta is a subspecies of the wasp Dolichovespula pacifica. It has yellow markings instead of white.

Distribution 
North Burma, Tibet, Tibet-China Border

References

External links
 Specimen information at the Smithsonian

Vespidae
Subspecies